The Olsen Gang on the Track  is a 1975 Danish comedy film directed by Erik Balling and starring Ove Sprogøe. The film was the seventh in the Olsen-banden-series.

Plot
Following the Olsen Gang's only successful robbery in the previous film, they are seemingly living the perfect life in the bathing sun in Mallorca, particularly Yvonne, who has turned into an alcoholic. But they are not happy, as the suitcase containing their money is always chained to Egon. Meanwhile, Bøffen has tracked them down, and he manages to steal all their money. After the gang try to retrieve it, Egon ends up in prison back in Denmark, which gives the rest of the gang a good reason to go home too.

When Egon gets out of prison, he's got a new plan, as usual. So has Yvonne, however, she has alerted the police about the money which were stolen from them in Spain, and she asks for an advance in return. Egon also wants their money back, but it will be complicated. The money has now been invested in gold bars, which have to shipped by train - in an armored Franz Jäger wagon. The gang steal a diesel shunting locomotive and hijack the van. Everything is seemingly in control for Egon. However, he has overseen that the railway company (DSB) has changed the schedule to summertime, rendering his plan worthless and resulting in a dangerous task for the gang. Meanwhile, the police have arranged a summer outing at the railway company and Bøffen has discovered Egon's plan. The gang are actually successful in stealing the gold bars and they buy the majority stake in a Norwegian company. The tax administration do not see the income from Egon's trade appearing in the accounts, and so he ends up behind bars again.

Cast

 Ove Sprogøe as Egon Olsen
 Morten Grunwald as Benny Frandsen
 Poul Bundgaard as Kjeld Jensen
 Kirsten Walther as Yvonne Jensen
 Axel Strøbye as CID Inspector Jensen
 Ole Ernst as CID Constable Holm
 Paul Hagen as Signalman Godfredsen
 Helge Kjærulff-Schmidt as Signalman Brodersen
 Ove Verner Hansen as Bøffen
 Jes Holtsø as Børge Jensen
 Søren Steen as Brian / Bodyguard
 Ernst Meyer as Godsekspeditør i Glostrup
 Poul Thomsen as Godsekspeditør i København
 Pouel Kern as Hundevagt
 Erni Arneson as Miss Hansen, Egon's secretary 
 John Hahn-Petersen as Fuldmægtig fra Skattevæsenet
 Alf Andersen as Nordmand
 Jørgen Beck as Brovagt på Langebro
 Kirsten Hansen-Møller as The Policeman in Bathing Shorts' Wife
 Knud Hilding as Engine Driver
 Bertel Lauring as Lorry Driver
 Poul Reichhardt as Chief of Police  
 Finn Storgaard as The Policeman in Bathing Shorts

References

External links

1975 films
1975 comedy films
1970s Danish-language films
Films directed by Erik Balling
Films with screenplays by Erik Balling
1970s heist films
Olsen-banden films